WSNI (97.7 FM, "Sunny 97.7") is an American radio station licensed to serve the community of Keene, New Hampshire. The station is owned by Monadnock Radio Group, a division of Saga Communications, and the broadcast license is held by Saga Communications of New England, LLC. WSNI airs an adult contemporary music format.

History
The station's original construction permit was granted on February 1, 1980, with the call letters WXYW assigned on October 28; this was changed to WINQ-FM on December 29, 1982.  It took to the air in February 1983, though a license to cover was not issued until May 25, 1984.  (The "-FM" suffix was dropped on May 13, 1991.)

WINQ was originally licensed to Winchendon, Massachusetts, and primarily targeted its programming to northern Worcester County.  Initially, WINQ offered an easy listening format, airing primarily vocals, as well as several instrumentals an hour. In 1987, the station segued to an adult contemporary format; this gave way to an oldies format two years later. In 1993, WINQ again changed its format, this time to hot adult contemporary.

Saga purchased the station in 2003 and began to reorient WINQ to the Keene area.  After a brief stint simulcasting WKBK's news/talk format, the station became a country station that August.

In early 2005, Saga swapped formats with its sister station on 98.7 FM, becoming WOQL, an oldies station.  Around this time, WOQL relocated from its original transmitter near Winchendon to Fitzwilliam, New Hampshire, improving its signal in Keene.

The station changed its call letters to WSNI on October 16, 2006, prefacing its change to the current adult contemporary format at the end of 2006.  WSNI then continued its relocation into Keene; it changed its city of license to Swanzey and relocated its transmitter to Keene in November 2007, and again changed its city of license, this time to Keene itself, in late 2008.

Translators

W255BQ, the former WKNE translator in Claremont, is now W256BJ 99.1 Keene, which, after having relayed WKNE-HD2 for a while, has been relaying WSNI-HD2, since December 2018.

References

External links

Monadnock Broadcasting Group

SNI
Mainstream adult contemporary radio stations in the United States
Cheshire County, New Hampshire
Radio stations established in 1983
Keene, New Hampshire